The 2020–21 Winnipeg Jets season was the 22nd season for the National Hockey League franchise that was established on June 25, 1997, and the tenth in Winnipeg, since the franchise relocated from Atlanta prior to the start of the 2011–12 NHL season.

Due to the Canada–U.S. border restrictions brought in as a result of the COVID-19 pandemic, the Jets were re-aligned with the other six Canadian franchises into the newly-formed North Division. The league's 56 game season was played entirely within the new divisions, meaning that Winnipeg and the other Canadian teams played an all-Canadian schedule for the 2020–21 regular season as well as the first two rounds of the 2021 Stanley Cup playoffs.

On May 5, the Jets clinched a playoff berth after a 4–0 defeat over the Calgary Flames. In the First Round of the playoffs, they completed the franchise's first playoff sweep against the Edmonton Oilers, with a 4–3 triple overtime win in game four. However, the Jets were upset in the Second Round, being swept by the Montreal Canadiens.

Standings

Divisional standings

Schedule and results

Regular season
The regular season schedule was published on December 23, 2020.

Playoffs

Player statistics

Skaters

Goaltenders

†Denotes player spent time with another team before joining the Jets. Stats reflect time with the Jets only.
‡Denotes player was traded mid-season. Stats reflect time with the Jets only.

Notes

References

Winnipeg Jets seasons
Winnipeg Jets
Jets